Żupnik or Zupnik is a Polish language occupational surname derived from the occupation of  Żupnik.

The surname may refer to:

Zbigniew Żupnik (1951–2000), Polish painter
Israel Zupnik, namesake of three major buildings in Jerusalem, including Zupnik Synagogue in Givat Shaul
Moshe Zupnik, a Jewish helper to Japanese diplomat Chiune Sugihara during the Holocaust

Polish-language surnames
Jewish surnames